Lagani Rabukawaqa is a pop musician from Fiji who achieved fame in Oceania in the 1980s.

References

Fijian musicians
Living people
I-Taukei Fijian people
Year of birth missing (living people)